Michael William Delany (born 22 August 1965) is an Australian former sprint freestyle swimmer of the 1980s, who won a silver medal in the 4×100-metre freestyle relay at the 1984 Summer Olympics in Los Angeles.

Delany was best known for being a member of the so-called "Mean Machine".  Debuting at the 1982 Commonwealth Games in Brisbane, Delany combined with Neil Brooks, Greg Fasala and Graeme Brewer to claim gold in the 4×100-metre freestyle relay, gaining their nickname after three of them collectively shaving their heads for the race.  In the individual event, he claimed bronze behind Brooks and Fasala.  In Los Angeles, he competed in the relay, combining with Fasala, Brooks and Mark Stockwell to claim silver behind the United States team.  He also competed in the individual 100-metre freestyle, but was eliminated despite winning his heat in a time of 51.22 seconds.

See also
 List of Commonwealth Games medallists in swimming (men)
 List of Olympic medalists in swimming (men)

References
 

1965 births
Living people
Swimmers at the 1984 Summer Olympics
Olympic swimmers of Australia
Australian male freestyle swimmers
Medalists at the 1984 Summer Olympics
Olympic silver medalists for Australia
Olympic silver medalists in swimming
Swimmers at the 1982 Commonwealth Games
Commonwealth Games medallists in swimming
Commonwealth Games gold medallists for Australia
Commonwealth Games bronze medallists for Australia
20th-century Australian people
Medallists at the 1982 Commonwealth Games